is a type of Shinto shrine where the kami of a region are grouped together into a single sanctuary. This "region" may refer to a shōen, village or geographic area, but is more generally referred to a whole province. The term is also occasionally called "sōsha". The sōja are usually located near the provincial capital established in the Nara period under then ritsuryō system, and can either be a newly created shrine, or a designation for an existing shrine. The "sōja" can also be the "ichinomiya" of the province, which themselves are of great ritual importance.

Whenever a new kokushi was appointed by the central government to govern a province, it was necessary for him to visit all of the sanctuaries of his province in order to complete the rites necessary for ceremonial inauguration. Grouping the kami into one location near the capital of the province greatly facilitated this duty,

The first mention of "sōja" appeared in the Heian period, in the diary of Taira no Tokinori, dated March 9, 1099 in reference to the province of Inaba. 

The name "Sōja" is also found in place names such as the city of  Sōja in Okayama Prefecture.

See also
List of Shinto shrines
Ichinomiya
Kokubun-ji

References

Shinto shrines
Heian period